Transeuropean or Trans-European or variant, may refer to:

 Transeuropean Airlines (IATA airline code: UE; ICAO airline code: TEP; callsign: TRANSEURLINE), former Russian charter airline
 Trans European Airways (IATA airline code: HE; ICAO airline code: TEA; callsign: BELGAIR), former Belgian airline
 Trans European Aviation, former British charter airline
 Trans-European Suture Zone (geology) a geographic feature, the interface between the Eastern European Craton and later accretions
 Trans-European Division of Seventh-day Adventists (TED)
 Trans-European Networks (TEN), EU defined networks
 Trans-European Motorways (TEM), a UN project
 Trans-European Trunked Radio, a trunked radio network

See also

 Trans (disambiguation)
 European (disambiguation)
 Trans Euro Trail (TET) a motorcycle backpacking trail
 Transeuropa Compañía de Aviación (IATA airline code: TR; callsign: TRANSEUOPA), operating as Trans-Europa, a former Spanish airline
 Air Transport Europe (ICAO airline code: EAT; callsign: TRANS EUROPE), a Slovakian airline
 Trans Europe Foot Race, a multiday ultramarathon across Europe
 Trans Europe Halles (TEH), a trans-European network of cultural centres
 
 
 Pan-European (disambiguation)
 Transeuropa (disambiguation)